Johann Heinrich Ekchardt was a German typographer, printer and publisher.

Johann Heinrich Eckhardt was a son of a tenant farmer in Wüst Eldena, he was appointed and sworn in at the University of Greifswald on 10 August 1793 and held the office until 1815. He published 79 works in 139 publications in Latin and German.

Bibliography 
All publications are German editions.

 Geschichte Pommerns während dem achtzehnten Jahrhundert, Greifswald 1803

References

Sources 

 

German typographers and type designers
German publishers (people)
People associated with the University of Greifswald
18th-century German people
19th-century German people
Year of birth missing
Year of death missing